The second Rabbis' Sons album contained one of the only two songs they ever released with Yiddish lyrics (Mazel Tov).  Tov Lehodos was one of the group's most popular songs.  The liner notes to the album indicate that Baruch Chait had left the group to concentrate on his Talmudic studies at this point.  However, he contributed three new songs, played guitar and co-arranged the music.

Track listing

References
  To Life at FAU Jewish Sound Archives
  To Life at DJSA (Free registration)

1968 albums
Hasidic music
Jewish music albums